Rocket Factory Augsburg AG (RFA) is a German New Space start-up located in Augsburg. It was founded in 2018 with the mission to build rockets just like cars. Its multistage rocket, is currently under development and scheduled to launch in late 2023.

History

General 
Rocket Factory Augsburg was founded as a spin-off of OHB SE in 2018 by Jörn Spurmann (CCO of RFA), Stefan Brieschenk (COO of RFA), Hans Steiniger (CEO of MT Aerospace) and Marco Fuchs (CEO of OHB SE). These also make of the Board of the company together with Dr. Stefan Tweraser (CEO of RFA), who joined RFA in October 2021, and Jean-Jacques Dordain (Chairman).   OHB SE functions as a strategic investor, Apollo Capital Partners GmbH as financial investor. In March 2021 RFA moved to their new headquarters in Augsburg. The company employs more than 150 people from more than 30 international countries. In April 2022 RFA won the second round of the "DLR microlauncher competition". As part of this contract RFA will have to launch 150kg for the german aerospace center (DLR) onboard the first two RFA One flights. RFA will also receive €11 million to further the development of its launch vehicle.

Locations 
RFA is based in Augsburg, close to Munich. Since March 2021, the main factory and offices have been located at Berliner Allee 65, Augsburg. The company has a team based at the development and test site Esrange in Kiruna, Sweden. Since June 2021 RFA also has a Portuguese subsidiary, "RFA Portugal Unipessoal LDA", located in Matosinhos. It develops and qualifies composite structures for RFA ONE in collaboration with the technology center CEiiA. In January 2023, RFA announced that it had secured exclusive access to Launch Pad Fredo at the SaxaVord Spaceport in Scotland. The company said that the multi-year partnership included a “double-digit million pound investment” in SaxaVord by RFA. The company will use the facility to launch RFA ONE launch vehicle to polar and sun-synchronous orbits. The maiden flight of the RFA ONE will also be launched from SaxaVord.

Launch vehicle 

RFA One is a three-stage rocket designed to launch small satellites and payloads of initially up to 1,350 kg into polar orbits. The vehicle will be 30m long and have a diameter of 2m. It is currently in development and set to launch in late 2023. The vehicle is supposed to transport small and micro-satellites into Low Earth orbit (LEO) and Sun-synchronous orbit (SSO).

Technology 
The first stage will be powered by nine "Helix" - engines, each producing 100kN of thrust. The second stage will support a vacuum-optimised version of the Helix engine. The Helix engine will use rocket grade kerosene, known as RP1, as its propellant and liquid oxygen as its oxidizer. During 2020 the company switched from a gas-generator cycle to an oxygen-rich staged combustion cycle for its "Helix"-engines. Some components, e.g. the turbopump, of the early versions of the "Helix"-engine have been bought by Ukrainian company Pivdenmash, in order to shorten development time. Later versions of these components have been developed internally.

The third stage, also referred to as the orbital stage, will function as an orbital transfer vehicle (OTV). Since the engine of the space tug can be fired repeatedly, it is able to reach different orbits within one flight and complete different missions for different customers. It will use a not yet specified, non-hydrazine based, green propellant, which is re-ignitable.

Production & Tests 
The rocket is designed for serial production and is supposed to use a large number of COTS components to reduce production and launch costs. Central components of the engines of the first two stages are to be 3D printed. For later flights, the first stage is to be salvaged and reused, but there is no public concept for this yet. Official information on re-usability has not yet been shared by RFA.  RFA was the first European company to develop and successfully test a Staged Combustion Engine, when it conducted an 8 second test in July, 2021. During this test the engine reached a thermal steady-state. In August 2021 RFA performed a cryogenic pressure test on a prototype first stage, during which the prototype burst. Three hot fire tests for performed with the Helix rocket engine with a total duration of 74 seconds in July 2022, with plans to conduct an integrated system test and full duration fire test with a Helix on an upper stage tank before the end of 2022.

See also 

 Isar Aerospace
 HyImpulse
 PLD Space

References

External links 
 Official website

Rocketry
Private spaceflight companies
Aerospace companies of Germany